Robert Edward Wanner (born April 25, 1949) is a Canadian politician who was elected in the 2015 Alberta general election to the Legislative Assembly of Alberta representing the electoral district of Medicine Hat. On June 11, 2015, he was elected as Speaker of the Legislative Assembly of Alberta.

On April 18, 2016, Wanner threw interim PC leader Ric McIver out of the Alberta legislature for repeatedly refusing to sit down after learning that sheets explaining Wanner's ruling for an NDP amendment on a motion tabled by McIver had been distributed before the amendment was even debated on the floor.

Wanner did not seek re-election in the 2019 general election.

Electoral history

2015 general election

References

External links 
 

1949 births
Alberta New Democratic Party MLAs
Living people
People from Medicine Hat
People from Weyburn
Speakers of the Legislative Assembly of Alberta
21st-century Canadian politicians